David Leslie is an American performance artist and stuntman.

References

External links
 Impact Addict Website

Living people
American performance artists
Year of birth missing (living people)